Switzerland competed at the 2018 Winter Olympics in Pyeongchang, South Korea, from 9 to 25 February 2018, with 166 competitors in 14 sports. They won 15 medals in total (five gold, six silver and four bronze), ranking 7th in the medal table.

Medalists

Competitors
The following is the list of number of competitors participating at the Games per sport/discipline.

Curler Jenny Perret will compete in both women's and mixed doubles events.

Alpine skiing 

According to the quota allocation system determined by the FIS, Switzerland were allocated the maximum allowance of a team of 22 athletes. Also, according to their ranking in the 2018 World Cup Nations cup rankings, Switzerland entered the new Mixed Team Event as the number 2 seeds. The Swiss Olympic Association announced their selections on 29 January 2018. The day before the opening ceremony it was announced that Mélanie Meillard would have to fly home and miss the Olympics after sustaining a knee injury in training. Both Patrick Küng and Joana Hählen were selected to the team, but did not take part in any race.

Men

Women

Mixed

Biathlon 

Based on their Nations Cup rankings in the 2016–17 Biathlon World Cup, Switzerland has qualified a team of 5 men and 5 women. The Swiss Olympic Association announced the team for the Biathlon on 23 January 2018.

Men

Women

Mixed

Bobsleigh 

Based on their rankings in the 2017–18 Bobsleigh World Cup, Switzerland has qualified 5 sleds.

 Alex Baumann and Eveline Rebsamen (replacement athletes)

* – Denotes the driver of each sled

Cross-country skiing 

In line with the quota allocation system published by the FIS, the Swiss Olympic Association announced its selection of a team of 13 athletes in total on January 26, 2018. On January 29, the Olympic Association announced that due to health reasons, Jason Rüesch would be unable to compete in the games, and there would be no replacement named to the team.

Distance
Men

Women

Sprint

Curling

Switzerland will compete in all three events, including the debuting mixed doubles event.

Summary

Men's tournament
Switzerland has qualified a men's team by earning enough points in the last two World Curling Championships.

Round-robin
Switzerland has a bye in draws 4, 8 and 12.

Draw 1
Wednesday, 14 February, 09:05

Draw 2
Wednesday, 14 February, 20:05

Draw 3
Thursday, 15 February, 14:05

Draw 5
Friday, 16 February, 20:05

Draw 6
Saturday, 17 February, 14:05

Draw 7
Sunday, 18 February, 09:05

Draw 9
Monday, 19 February, 14:05

Draw 10
Tuesday, 20 February, 09:05

Draw 11
Wednesday, 20 February, 20:05

Tiebreaker
Thursday, 22 February, 9:05

Semifinal
Thursday, 22 February, 20:05

Bronze-medal game
Friday, 23 February, 15:35

Women's tournament
Switzerland has qualified a women's team by earning enough points in the last two World Curling Championships. The women's team was determined at the 2017 Swiss Olympic Curling Trials, which was won by Team Silvana Tirinzoni, who went undefeated in the tournament.

Round-robin
Switzerland has a bye in draws 2, 6 and 10.

Draw 1
Wednesday, 14 February, 14:05

Draw 3
Thursday, 15 February, 20:05

Draw 4
Friday, 16 February, 14:05

Draw 5
Saturday, 17 February, 09:05

Draw 7
Sunday, 18 February, 14:05

Draw 8
Monday, 19 February, 09:05

Draw 9
Monday, 19 February, 20:05

Draw 11
Wednesday, 21 February, 09:05

Draw 12
Wednesday, 21 February, 20:05

Mixed doubles

Switzerland has qualified a mixed doubles team by earning enough points in the last two World Mixed Doubles Curling Championships.

Draw 1
Thursday, February 8, 9:05

Draw 2
Thursday, February 8, 20:04

Draw 3
Friday, February 9, 8:35

Draw 4
Friday, February 9, 13:35

Draw 5
Saturday, February 10, 9:05

Draw 6
Saturday, February 10, 20:04

Draw 7
Sunday, February 11, 9:05

Semifinal
Monday, February 12, 20:05

Gold-medal game
Tuesday, February 13, 20:05

Figure skating 

Switzerland qualified one female figure skater through the 2017 CS Nebelhorn Trophy. The team was announced on December 22, 2017.

Freestyle skiing 

On 25 January 2018, the Swiss Olympic Association confirmed their selection of a total of 23 athletes across the Freestyle skiing disciplines.  On January 31 it was announced that Marco Tadé could not compete in moguls, and that the Swiss would not substitute another athlete for him.

Aerials

Halfpipe

Moguls

Ski cross

Qualification legend: FA – Qualify to medal round; FB – Qualify to consolation round

Slopestyle

Ice hockey 

Summary

Men's tournament

Switzerland men's national ice hockey team qualified by finishing as one of the top eight teams in the 2015 IIHF World Ranking.

Team roster

Preliminary round

Qualification playoff

Women's tournament

Switzerland women's national ice hockey team qualified by winning the final qualification tournament in Arosa, Switzerland.

Team roster

Preliminary round

Quarterfinal

5–8th place semifinal

Fifth place game

Luge 

Based on the results from the World Cups during the 2017–18 Luge World Cup season, Switzerland qualified 2 sleds. However they declined one of the quotas.

Nordic combined 

Based on the results from the World Cups during the 2016–17 season and the 2017–18 season up to January 22, Tim Hug was the only athlete to meet the required points tally. On 22 January 2018, his selection was confirmed by the Swiss Olympic Association.

Skeleton 

Based on the world rankings, Switzerland qualified 2 sleds, one female and one male athlete. However they declined one of the quotas.

Ski jumping 

According to the quota allocation list published by the FIS, Switzerland were allowed to enter four male athletes. However, on 25 January the Swiss Olympic Association announced it would be declining two of the places, and therefore also would not be entering the team event.

Snowboarding 

According to the quota allocation system determined by the FIS, Switzerland were allocated the maximum allowance of a team of 25 athletes. The Swiss Olympic Association announced their selections on 29 January 2018. Elias Allenspach was a late replacement for David Hablützel who could not recover in time from a concussion and bruising.

Freestyle
Men

Women

Qualification Legend: QF – Qualify directly to final; QS – Qualify to semifinal

Parallel

Snowboard cross

Qualification legend: FA – Qualify to medal round; FB – Qualify to consolation round
* Qualify immediately to consolation round after being disqualified in the semifinals

Speed skating 

Based on the quota allocation system, Switzerland qualified one skater in the Men's 1500m, Men's 5000m, Men's mass start and Women's mass start. The Swiss Olympic Association confirmed the selections on 15 January 2018.

Individual

Mass start

References

Nations at the 2018 Winter Olympics
2018
Winter Olympics